Nicole Therese Sanderson (born 1 April 1976 in Perth, Western Australia) is an Australian beach volleyball player.

Sanderson started her career in indoor volleyball where played for Pepperdine University, in the United States. In 1998 she competed for the first time in FIVB Beach Volleyball World Tour where she took part until the 2006 season.

Her best World Tour result was a second place in Osaka, Japan, alongside Natalie Cook in 2004. That year they have been selected to represent Australia at the 2004 Summer Olympics, in Athens. Cook had won the gold medal at the 2000 Sydney Olympics (with Kerri Pottharst) and they won a bronze medal at the 2003 Beach Volleyball World Championships in Rio de Janeiro. They finished the Olympics in fourth place after losing the bronze medal match to Americans Holly McPeak and Elaine Youngs.

References

External links
 
 
 

1976 births
Living people
Australian women's beach volleyball players
Olympic beach volleyball players of Australia
Beach volleyball players at the 2004 Summer Olympics
Sportspeople from Perth, Western Australia